Deep Seven or Deep 7 refers to seven species of deep water fish of cultural, commercial, and recreational importance found in the Hawaiian Archipelago and Johnston Island. The Deep Seven are:

See List of fish of Hawaii.

External links
National Oceanic and Atmospheric Administration (NOAA) 
State of Hawai'i Division of Aquatic Resources
Western Pacific Regional Fishery Management Council

 
Fish, Deep Seven
Hawaii